Kim Brown may refer to:

 Kim Brown (The Unit), a fictional character on the CBS television series The Unit
 Kim Brown (musician) (1945–2011), British-born Finland-based musician with The Renegades
 Kimberly J. Brown (born 1984), American actress